Pagellus bellottii, the red pandora) is present in the eastern Atlantic, from the Strait of Gibraltar to Angola, and the Canary Islands. It is also recorded in the Mediterranean Sea since 1960. This demersal species is commonly found between 10 and 50 m of depth. Individuals can reach 42 cm, but average 25 cm. It is a protogynic hermaphrodite; individuals start out life as females, and some become male later on.

It is commercially fished, with 10,031 t taken in 2008. Most of the catch is made from 26° N southwards.

References

External links
 
 

bellottii
Commercial fish
Fish of the Atlantic Ocean
Fish of the Mediterranean Sea
Fish described in 1882